In accounting, reconciliation is the process of ensuring that two sets of records (usually the balances of two accounts) are in agreement. It is a general practice for businesses to create their balance sheet at the end of the financial year as it denotes the state of finances for that period. Reconciliation is used to ensure that the money leaving an account matches the actual money spent. This is done by making sure the balances match at the end of a particular accounting period.

Definition 
The following two definitions are given by the Oxford Dictionary of Accounting.

i) “A procedure for confirming that the balance in a chequebook matches the corresponding bank statement. This is normally done by preparing a bank reconciliation statement.

ii) A procedure for confirming the reliability of a company’s accounting records by regularly comparing [balances of transactions]. An account reconciliation may be prepared on a daily, monthly, or annual basis.”

The generally accepted accounting principles (GAAP) are a set of accounting principles, procedures and standards that organisations use in order to compile their financial statements. GAAP states that the purpose of account reconciliation is to provide accuracy and consistency in financial accounts. To ensure all cash outlays and inlays match between cashflow statements and income statements it is necessary to carry out reconciliation accounts.

Reconciliation is a process that may benefit businesses as this may help avoid balance sheet errors which may have led to detrimental ramifications; in addition, reconciliation may help against fraud and can help instill financial integrity.

Accounting software is one of a number of tools that organisations use to carry out this process thus eliminating errors and therefore making accurate decisions based on the financial information. Reconciliation of accounts determines whether transactions are in the correct place or should be shifted into a different account.

Reconciliation in accounting is not only important for businesses, but may also be convenient for households and individuals. It is prudent to reconcile credit card accounts and chequebooks on a regular basis, for example. This is done by comparing debit card receipts or check copies with a persons bank statements.

The benefits of reconciling:
 mitigates mistakes which have been made by financial institutions or if there have been any fraudulent withdraws from an account. 
 helps create an overall image on spending and helps assess if a person is overspending on fees.

Account reconciliation is an important internal control in the financial reporting process. Public companies are required to perform these steps as part of their financial close.

Methods 
To ensure the reliability of the financial records, reconciliations must, therefore, be performed for all balance sheet accounts on a regular and ongoing basis.  A robust reconciliation process improves the accuracy of the financial reporting function and allows the finance department to publish financial reports with confidence.

There are two ways in which reconciliation can take place:
 Using a documentation review, “document review is a formalised technique of data collection involving the examination of existing records or documents.” This is the most common approach of account reconciliation. This method is done by using accounting software. 
 The second method used is analytics review. “Any process by which a person or company looks at an account or financial statement and attempts to identify any irregularities. This may involve comparing financial and non-financial information.” Reconciliation of accounts using this method is undertaken by estimating the transactions that should be in an account, usually based on other data, for example historical activity.

In both cases where mistakes are identified as a result of the reconciliation, adjustments should be undertaken in order for the account balance to match the supporting information.

Current practice 
Currently there are no specific account standards for accountancy reconciliation per se. However, there are different rules for balancing many types of accounts.  There are no specific regulations mentioned by IAS, ICAW and HMRC. GAAP provide different rules in regards to reconciliation to balance different types of accounts. According to GAAP, account reconciliation is a process that is performed through account conversion or double-entry accounting.

Manual reconciliation to automation 
In the United States, the passage in 2002 of the Sarbanes–Oxley Act (SOX) has emphasized the need for balance sheet account reconciliation to be included within a company's own procedures, not relying only on external auditors. The legislation was enacted “to protect shareholders and general public from accounting errors and fraudulent practices in the enterprise, as well as improve the accuracy of corporate disclosures.” SOX and other acts like it across the world have increased stress on organisations to comply. As a result, the accounting industry has sought ways to automate a previously strenuous manual process. The pressure of SOX coupled with the perennial need to mitigate erroneous reconciliation in the process.

By using available information technology, organizations can more easily automate their reconciliation and for each financial close cycle less manual labour would be required. As late as 2012, 90% of companies still reconciled manually, using Microsoft Excel spreadsheets. This process is arduous allowing for further human error. Automating reconciliation can significantly reduce aforementioned errors and increase efficiency. Further benefits of automated reconciliation include centralised control, improved monitoring, reduced operational costs, increased productivity and efficiency, improved accessibility, improved data security and reduced audit risks and costs.

See also 
 Bank reconciliation

References 

Banking terms